Brahmapuri is a settlement in the city of Jodhpur in Rajasthan, India.

Jodhpur
Neighbourhoods in Rajasthan